B. G. Kher became the prime minister of Bombay Presidency for the second time on 3 April 1946. He had previously served in the office from 1937 to 1939. On account of Second World War, the premiership was vacant from 1939 to 1946. Kher continued till Indian Independence on 15 August 1947, after which, the office was abolished and Kher succeeded himself as the chief minister of Bombay State.

List of ministers
The ministry consisted of 10 cabinet ministers and 8 parliamentary secretaries.

Parliamentary secretaries
 S. R. Kanthi
B. D. Jatti
 K. F. Patil
 S. P. Gaonkar
 Indumathi Seth
 Yashwantrao Chavan
 D. K. Kunte
 D. N. Wandrekar
 P. K. Sawant

References

Indian National Congress
1946 in India
K
Cabinets established in 1946
Cabinets disestablished in 1947
Bombay Presidency